William L. May (February 4, 1913 – November 9, 2004) was an American football player who played two seasons in the National Football League (NFL) for the Chicago Cardinals as a quarterback and fullback. He played college football at Louisiana State University for the LSU Tigers.

References

LSU Tigers football players
American football fullbacks
American football quarterbacks
1913 births
2004 deaths
Chicago Cardinals players